Burberry is a British luxury fashion house established in 1856 by Thomas Burberry headquartered in London, England. It currently designs and distributes ready to wear, including trench coats (for which it is most famous), leather accessories, and footwear. Its name and branding are licensed to Coty for fragrances and cosmetics and to Luxottica for eyewear.

History

Early years, 19th century
Burberry was founded in 1856 when 21-year-old Thomas Burberry, a former draper's apprentice, opened his own store in Basingstoke, Hampshire, England. By 1870, the business had established itself by focusing on the development of outdoors attire. In 1879, Burberry introduced gabardine to his brand, a hardwearing, water-resistant yet breathable fabric, in which the yarn is waterproofed before weaving. In 1891, Burberry opened a shop in the Haymarket, London.

20th century

In 1901, the Burberry Equestrian Knight logo was developed containing the Latin word "Prorsum", meaning "forwards", and later registered it as a trademark in 1909. In 1911, the company became the outfitters for Roald Amundsen, the first man to reach the South Pole, and Ernest Shackleton, who led a 1914 expedition to cross Antarctica. A Burberry gabardine jacket was worn by George Mallory on his attempt on Mount Everest in 1924.

Adapted to meet the needs of military personnel, the "trench coat" was born during the First World War due to its being worn by British officers in the trenches. After the war, it became popular with civilians. The Burberry check has been in use since at least the 1920s, primarily as a lining in its trench coats. Burberry also specially designed aviation garments. In 1937, A. E. Clouston and Betty Kirby-Green broke the world record for the fastest return flight from London to Cape Town in The Burberry airplane that was sponsored by the brand. Burberry was an independent family-controlled company until 1955, when Great Universal Stores (GUS) assumed ownership.

Influences and rise to prominence 
During the 1970s and 1980s, Burberry signed agreements with worldwide manufacturers to produce complementary products to the existing British collection such as suits, trousers, shirts, sportswear, accessories, for men, ladies, and children. These products, designed under the strict control of headquarters in London, were produced and distributed through independent retail stores worldwide as well as the Burberry stores, and contributed to the growth of the brand in sales and profits through to the late 90s, although the full extent of sales was not apparent in the parent company accounts since much was done through licensed agreements. The company had signed Lord Litchfield as photographer, Lord (Leonard) Wolfson was Chairman and Stanley Peacock OBE Managing Director. In 1997, GUS director Victor Barnett became chairman of Burberry, hiring Rose Marie Bravo to execute a corporate reorganization and restoration of the brand as a luxury fashion house. Barnett led the company up to its successful IPO in 2001.

21st century
In May 2001, Christopher Bailey joined Burberry as creative director. Christopher Bailey has been the chief creative officer since 2014, as well as CEO from 2014 – November 2017. Bailey stepped down as chief creative officer in March 2018 and departed the brand completely by the end of 2018.

Between 2001 and 2005, Burberry became associated with "chav" and football hooligan culture. This change in the brand reputation was attributed to lower priced products, the proliferation of counterfeit goods adopting Burberry's trademark check pattern, and adoption by celebrities prominently identified with "chav" culture. The association with football hooliganism led to the wearing of Burberry check garments being banned at some venues. GUS divested its remaining interest in Burberry in December 2005. Burberry Group plc was initially floated on the London Stock Exchange in July 2002. In 2005, Sanyo-shokai was the Burberry ready-to-wear licence holder in Japan with retail value of €435 million.

In 2006, Rose Marie Bravo, who as chief executive had led Burberry to mass market success through licensing, decided to retire. She was replaced by another American, Angela Ahrendts, who joined from Liz Claiborne in January 2006, and took up the position of CEO on 1 July 2006. Ahrendts and Bailey successfully turned around the then chav-like reputation that the brand had acquired at the end of Bravo's tenure and cheapening effect of the brand's omnipresence, by removing the brand's check-pattern from all but 10% of the company's products, taking the fragrance and beauty product licenses back in-house and buying out the Spanish franchise that was worth 20% of group revenues.
Burberry first sold online in the US, then in the UK in October 2006, and the rest of the EU in 2007. Bailey became Chief Creative Officer in November 2009. It was reported in 2012 Ahrendts was the highest paid CEO in the UK, making £16.9m.

In October 2013, it was announced that Ahrendts would take up the position of Senior Vice President of retail and online at Apple, Inc. from April 2014, and be replaced as CEO by Bailey. During her tenure, sales increased to over £2 billion, and shares gained more than threefold to £7 billion. Burberry promotes its British connection; according to The Guardian, a British national daily newspaper, as of July 2012, Burberry maintains two production facilities in Great Britain, one in Castleford producing raincoats, and one in Keighley. In spring 2014, fashion designer Christopher Bailey became CEO of Burberry and retained the role as chief creative officer. His basic salary was £1.1m, with total compensation of up to £10m a year depending on sales targets being met.

In July 2016, it was announced that Celine boss Marco Gobbetti would become CEO of the FTSE 100 Company, while Christopher Bailey became the Creative Director and President. In 2016, the label launched its "Mr Burberry" fragrance.

In early May 2017, the store announced it was moving 300 employees from London to Leeds. In July 2017, Gobbetti replaced Bailey as CEO. In March 2018, Burberry named Riccardo Tisci, creative director at Givenchy from 2005 to 2007, as the brand's chief creative officer. A few months later, Tisci presented a new logo and monogram for the brand, designed by the English graphic designer Peter Saville.

In April 2018, it was announced that Sir John Peace would be stepping down as chairman of the board and be replaced by Gerry Murphy. Murphy had served as CEO of Kingfisher plc, as well as being current chairman of Tate and Lyle and The Blackstone Group International Partners LLP. Peace's departure marks a change in leadership for the group with Gobetti and Ahrends having left the previous years.

In May 2018, it was reported that Burberry had filed a lawsuit against Target claiming that Target had copied its check print designs and was seeking amount of $2 million, in addition to the amount to cover its legal fees.

In July 2018, it was reported that in the previous past five years Burberry had destroyed unsold clothes, accessories, and perfume worth over £90m in order to protect its brand and prevent the items being stolen or sold cheaply. While a representative of Greenpeace criticised the decision, Burberry claimed that the energy generated from burning its products was captured, making it environmentally friendly. According to Burberry's annual report, by the end of the financial year 2018, the company had destroyed goods worth £28.6m, an increase on the £26.9m from its financial year 2017. In September 2018, Burberry reported that it would stop the practice of burning unsold goods, with immediate effect. Burberry also announced it would stop using real fur in its products, and would phase out existing fur items.

In February 2019, Burberry apologized for showcasing a hoodie with a noose around the neck during its show at London Fashion Week. The retailer said it has removed the item from its collection, after criticism from one of its own models led to an online backlash. In February 2020 Burberry was forced to close 24 of its 64 Chinese mainland stores because of COVID-19.

In 2021, Burberry announced that it would become a "climate positive" company by 2040. The fashion brand also announced that it would commit to a new target reduce chain emissions by 46% by 2030, an increase from an earlier pledge of a 30% reduction. In March 2021, Burberry was the first luxury brand to be targeted in China as part of the backlash regarding sanctions against the alleged human rights abuses in Xinjiang. Brand ambassador and Actress Zhou Dongyu terminated her contract with Burberry.

In 2022, the company's chief operating and financial officer announced a ban on the use of exotic skins—such as alligator and snake—in its collections. In September 2022, Burberry announced designer Daniel Lee, former creative director of Bottega Veneta, as Riccardo Tisci's replacement as the company's chief creative officer.

In February 2023 a new logo and branding was introduced under the new creative director Daniel Lee the new branding brought back the Equestrian Knight logo. The advertising campigan features famous British models & musicians such as Shygirl, Liberty Ross, Skepta & more.

Logos

References

External links

 Official Burberry Group plc corporate website
 Official Burberry consumer website
 

 
Clothing brands of the United Kingdom
Clothing companies of England
Clothing companies based in London
Clothing retailers of England
Companies listed on the London Stock Exchange
High fashion brands
Fashion accessory brands
Luxury brands
Companies based in Hampshire
British companies established in 1856
Clothing companies established in 1856
Retail companies established in 1856
1856 establishments in England
British Royal Warrant holders
British brands
Youth culture in the United Kingdom
Eyewear brands of the United Kingdom
Companies based in the City of Westminster
1940s fashion
1950s fashion
1980s fashion
1990s fashion
2001 initial public offerings